Finn Carling (1 October 1925 – 12 March 2004) was a Norwegian novelist, playwright, poet and essayist.

Biography
He was born in Oslo, Norway.   He took artium in 1945 and studied psychology at the University of Oslo from 1945-49. He followed with a course of study of sociology, history and literature at Howard University in Washington, D.C. during 1957-58.

He made his literary debut in 1949 with Broen (two short stories and a one-act play). He had  authorship of several genres, and became a key figure in Norwegian post-war literature. Carling had innate cerebral palsy. He described his childhood and adolescence with this disability in the autobiographical novel Kilden og muren (1958).

He died during 2004 and was buried at  Voksen kirkegård in Oslo.

Awards 
Riksmål Society Literature Prize - 1970
Gyldendal's Endowment - 1976
Dobloug Prize - 1986
Aschehoug Prize - 1987
Norsk kulturråds ærespris - 1999

References

Other sources
 

1925 births
2004 deaths
Writers from Oslo
Norwegian male poets
Norwegian essayists
Norwegian male novelists
Norwegian male dramatists and playwrights
20th-century Norwegian poets
20th-century Norwegian novelists
20th-century Norwegian dramatists and playwrights
20th-century essayists
20th-century Norwegian male writers
Male essayists
Dobloug Prize winners